XZ, X.Z., or xz may refer to:

 xz, a lossless data compression file format based on the LZMA algorithm, often with the file extension ".xz"
XZ Utils, a set of free lossless data compressors, including the command xz
 Yamaha XZ 550, a motorcycle produced c. 1982–1983
 XZ Tauri, a binary star system in the constellation Taurus 
 XZ, a type of PSA X automobile engine
 Tibet Autonomous Region, China (Guobiao abbreviation XZ)